National Highway 60 or NH 60 is a National Highway of India that runs from the junction with NH 5 at Balasore to junction with NH 34 at Morgram. It passes through Jaleswar, Dantan, Belda, Narayangarh, Kharagpur, Medinipur, Salboni, Chandrakona Road Durllabhganj, Bishnupur, Bankura, Gangajalghati, Mejia and Raniganj, Pandaveshwar, Dubrajpur, Suri, Mohammad Bazar, Mallarpur, Rampurhat, Nalhati. 

The Sheoraphuli–Kamarkundu–Tarakeswar–Arambagh Road meets NH 60 at Bishnupur. It meets and mixes up with the Bankura–Jhargram Road (State Highway 9) at Dhaldanga up to Bikna.

See also
 List of National Highways in India
 List of National Highways in India (by Highway Number)
 National Highways Development Project

References

External links
 
 

60
60
60
National highways in India (old numbering)
Transport in Birbhum district
Transport in Balasore